The VIII Air Support Command is a disbanded United States Army Air Forces unit. It was assigned to Eighth Air Force throughout its existence, and it was last stationed at Sunninghill Park, England, where it was disbanded on 1 December 1943.

VIII Air Support Command engaged in training, with one reconnaissance and one troop carrier group assigned, until July 1943. Afterward, carried out medium bombardment operations against the enemy on the Continent until October 1943 when all components and personnel were withdrawn from the command, with most transferred to Ninth Air Force, which transferred to England from Africa to become the primary tactical command for the invasion of Europe.  The command was disbanded little more than a month later.

History
The 8th Ground Air Support Command was organized on 28 April 1942 at Bolling Field, Washington, D.C. commanded by Col. Robert C. Candee and assigned to 8th Air Force.  The command drew most of its cadre from 5th Air Support Command.   Col. Candee was promoted to Brigadier General. The command moved to Savannah, Georgia the following month, joining its parent, 8th Air Force.  the command headquarters, but not its assigned units, for England in July , but did not open its headquarters at RAF Membury in Berkshire until 17 August.

The mission of VIII Ground Air Support Command was initially training reconnaissance and troop transport units. In February 1943, the command's mission was expanded to carrying out medium bombardment operations against the enemy on the Continent.

In February 1941, the first Martin B-26 Marauder medium bombers were accepted by the Army Air Forces. It was to be in the European theater where the Marauder was to achieve its greatest success. In the United Kingdom, the Marauder formed the medium bomber forces of the VIII Air Support Command. The first B-26s arrived in the United Kingdom in February 1943. They were to be used in low-level missions against German military targets on the Continent.

On 16 October 1943, the B-26 Marauder units were reassigned to IX Bomber Command, leaving the command without operational units. Its command staff was reassigned to other units, and the command was disbanded on 1 December 1943.

Lineage
 Constituted as 8th Ground Air Support Command on 24 April 1942
 Activated on 28 April 1942
 Redesignated VIII Air Support Command c. 18 September 1942
 Disbanded on 1 December 1943

Assignments
United States Air Forces in Europe, 28 April 1942 – 1 December 1943

Components
 Wings
 3d Bombardment Wing, c. 12 June 1943 – 16 October 1943
 44th Bombardment Wing, c. 28 September 1943 – c. November 1943

 Groups
 68th Observation Group: attached c. 18–22 June 1942; assigned 23 June – c. 4 [July] 1942
 386th Bombardment Group, 15 June – 16 October 1943

 Squadrons
 6th Communications Squadron, Air Support: 10 June – c. 2 August 1942

Stations
 Bolling Field, District of Columbia, 28 April 1942
 Savannah, Georgia, 29 May-c. 20 July 1942
 Bushey Park (AAF-586), England, July 1942
 RAF Membury (AAF-466), England, 21 August 1942
 Sunninghill Park (AAF-472), England, 19 October 1942 – 1 December 1943

References

Notes
 Explanatory notes

 Citations

Bibliography

 
 
  
 
 

08 Command Air
Military units and formations disestablished in 1943